A Christmas card is a greeting card sent as part of the traditional celebration of Christmas.

Christmas Card can also refer to:

Music
Christmas Card (The Statler Brothers album)
A Christmas Card, an album by The Forester Sisters
Jimmy Dean's Christmas Card, an album by Jimmy Dean
A Partridge Family Christmas Card
The Temptations Christmas Card
"Christmas Card", a song from Steven Curtis Chapman's album Joy

Film
The Christmas Card